Jack Hasen (20 March 1942 – 14 June 2007) was a Canadian sailor who competed in the 1968 Summer Olympics. He was born in Windsor, Ontario.

References

1942 births
2007 deaths
Sportspeople from Windsor, Ontario
Canadian male sailors (sport)
Olympic sailors of Canada
Sailors at the 1968 Summer Olympics – 5.5 Metre
20th-century Canadian people